Kyiv Oblast Football Federation (KOFF) is a football governing body in the region of Kyiv Oblast, Ukraine. The federation is a collective member of the Ukrainian Association of Football.

The organization has been formed in fall of 1964.

Previous Champions

1946    FC Vasylkiv
1947    ????
1948    ????
1949    DO Cherkasy
1950    FC Kharchovyk Smila
1951    FC Kharchovyk Smila (2)
1952    FC Kharchovyk Smila (3)
1953    FC Torpedo Fastiv
1954    Boryspil Raion team
1955    FC Torpedo Fastiv (2)
1956    FC Spartak Kahanovychi Pershi
1957    FC Avanhard Fastiv
1958    FC Urozhai Boryspil
1959    FC Avanhard Fastiv (2)
1960    FC Spartak Bila Tserkva
1961    FC Spartak Bila Tserkva (2)
1962    FC Spartak Bila Tserkva (3)
1963    FC Temp Bila Tserkva
1964    FC Spartak Bila Tserkva (4)
1965    FC Zoria Vasylkiv
1966    FC Spartak Bila Tserkva (5)
1967    FC Silmash Bila Tserkva
1968    FC Avtomobilist Bila Tserkva
1969    FC Kholodylnyk Vasylkiv
1970    FC Kholodylnyk Vasylkiv (2)
1971    FC Irpin
1972    FC Budivelnyk Brovary
1973    FC Budivelnyk Brovary (2)
1974    FC Spartak Bila Tserkva (6)
1975    FC Refryzherator Fastiv
1976    FC Refryzherator Fastiv (2)
1977    FC Refryzherator Fastiv (3)
1978    FC Refryzherator Fastiv (4)
1979 FC Rubin Piskivka
1980    FC Mashynobudivnyk Borodianka
1981    FC Budivelnyk Pripyat
1982    FC Budivelnyk Pripyat (2)
1983    FC Budivelnyk Pripyat (3)
1984 FC Silmash Bila Tserkva (2)
1985    FC Mashynobudivnyk Borodianka (2)
1986 FC Refryzherator Fastiv (5)
1987    FC Mashynobudivnyk Borodianka (3)
1988    FC Nyva Myronivka
1989 FC Blyskavka Baryshivka
1990 FC Refryzherator Fastiv (6)
1991 FC Prometei Boyarka
1992    FC Nyva Myronivka (2)
1993 FC Refryzherator Fastiv (7)
1994 FC Saturn Irpin
1995 FC Kolos Karapyshi (3)
1996 FC Refryzherator Fastiv (8)
1997 FC Refryzherator Fastiv (9)
1998    UFEI Irpin
1999(s) FC Refryzherator Fastiv (10)
1999(f) FC Sokil Velyka Dymerka
2000 FC Kartonnyk Obukhiv
2001    FC Podatkova Akademia Irpin (2)
2002    FC Bucha
2003 FC Dnipro Obukhiv
2004 FC Dnipro Obukhiv (2)
2005 FC Hran Buzova
2006    FC Arsenal Bila Tserkva
2007 FC Putrivka
2008 FC Putrivka (2)
2009 FC Inter Fursy
2010 FC Putrivka (3)
2011    FC Dinaz Vyshhorod
2012    FC Kolos Kovalivka
2013    FC Kolos Kovalivka (2)
2014    FC Kolos Kovalivka (3)
2015    FC Chaika Petropavlivska-Borshchahivka
2016 FC Dzhuniors Shpytky
2017    FC Avanhard Bziv
2018    FC Avanhard Bziv (2)
2019    FC Avanhard Bziv (3)
2020    Kudrivka Irpin
2021    Nyva Buzova

Winners
 10 - Refryzherator Fastiv
 6 - Spartak Bila Tserkva
 3 - 7 clubs (Budivelnyk Pr., Mashynobudivnyk, FC Nyva M. (Kolos Ka.), Putrivka, Kolos Ko., Avanhard B., Kharchovyk)
 2 - 7 clubs (Podatkova Akademia (UFEI), Dnipro O., Budivelnyk Br., Kholodylnyk, Silmash, Avanhard F., Torpedo)
 1 - 24 clubs
 2 seasons - unknown winners
 4 times competitions were won by teams from Cherkasy Oblast created in 1954

Cup winners

2004 FC Hran Buzova
2005    FC Dinaz Vyshhorod
2006    FC Arsenal Bila Tserkva
2007    FC Irpin Horenychi
2008    FC Irpin Horenychi
2009 FC Inter Fursy
2010    FC Bucha
2011    FC Bucha
2012    FC Dinaz Vyshhorod
2013    FC Chaika Petropavlivska-Borshchahivka
2014    FC Kolos Kovalivka
2015    FC Dinaz Vyshhorod
2016    FC Sokil Mykhailivka-Rubezhivka
2017    FC Desna Pohreby

Professional clubs
 FC Ros Bila Tserkva (Ryhonda, Dynamo Irpin), 1984-2011
 FC Transimpeks Vyshneve, 1994/95 --> Vostok Slavutych
 FC Systema-Boreks Borodianka, 1993-2005 --> FC Inter Boyarka
 FC Inter Boyarka, 2005-2007
 FC Nyva Myronivka, 1992-1996
 FC Slavutych (Nerafa, Vostok), 1995-1998
 FC Borysfen Boryspil, 1997-2007
 FC Borysfen-2 Boryspil, 2001-2004
 FC Nafkom Brovary (Naftovyk Irpin), 2001-2009
 FC Knyazha Shchaslyve, 2005-2009
 FC Knyazha-2 Shchaslyve, 2008/09
 FC Arsenal Bila Tserkva, 2007-2018
 FC Kolos Kovalivka, 2015-
 SC Chaika Petropavlivska Borshchahivka, 2018-
 FC Dinaz Vyshhorod, 2019-
 FC Lyubomyr Stavyshche, 2021
 FC Nyva Buzova, 2022-

See also
 FFU Council of Regions
 Football Federation of Kyiv

References

External links
 Official website
 Historical podium. KOAF (KOFF) website.

Football in the regions of Ukraine
Football governing bodies in Ukraine
Sport in Kyiv Oblast